Tang Shenwei (c.1056-1093), courtesy name Shenyuan, was a Chinese physician of the Song Dynasty. He compiled an influential pharmacopoeia, Zhenglei bencao (證類本草).

Career

Tang Shenwei was born in a family of professional physicians from Jinyuan (晉原; in today's Chongzhou, Sichuan).

Zhenglei bencao

Tang spent several years on studying books on pharmaceuticals to create his own compendium. He merged the entirety of some existing works and added information researched on his own to the compilation. The book was ready about 1082–1083. Its full title, Jingshi zhenglei beiji bencao translates as "Ready-to-use pharmacopoeia, classified as collected from the Classics and historiographical books".

The compendium encompassed 1,748 different drugs (476 of which were not included in the previous texts) and beyond 4,000 treating methods. It quotes more than 240 ancient written sources, many of which are lost today. Part of the information hails from his own research. In the preface, Tang summarized the history of materia medica books and explained the way in which he carried out the compilation. Every drug entry includes the description of usage, function in the Chinese medicine framework, places or origin, methods of collection and preparation. 933 illustrations are included for easier identification. Some of the medical materials were not described before in any known book.

The book has spawned many editions, including state-sponsored revisions. It stayed influential for several centuries, even if outshined by the even more monumental Bencao gangmu of the Ming Dynasty. Its author, Li Shizhen spoke about Tang Shenwei favorably.

Depictions
Song dynasty official Yuwen Xuzhong described Tang Shenwei as "ugly in appearance and slow in demeanor and speech".

The Strange Doctor Tang Shenwei (怪医唐慎微), a 2014 film produced by CCTV6 and directed by Fang Junliang, depicts Tang Shenwei's life, with actor  in the title role.

References

Notes

Citations

Bibliography

 

Chinese non-fiction writers
11th-century Chinese physicians
Song dynasty people
Song dynasty science writers